William Henry Eustis (July 17, 1845 – November 30, 1928) was the 17th mayor of Minneapolis, Republican nominee for Governor of Minnesota in 1898, and a philanthropist.

Biography
Eustis was born in Jefferson County, New York on July 17, 1845. When he was 15 years old, he contracted a hip disease, which required him to walk with a cane and then with crutches. Eustis graduated from Wesleyan University in Connecticut in 1873 and then got his law degree from Columbia Law School the next year.  He moved to Minneapolis in 1881 and started dealing in real estate, becoming more well known as an owner of downtown buildings than as an attorney. He served as the mayor of Minneapolis for one term, 1893 through 1895.

Later in life, he began to think about donating much of his wealth to charity, facetiously calling it "mostly unearned increment."

In 1923, he bought  of land on the west side of the Mississippi River and donated  to the Minneapolis School Board for the site of the Michael Dowling School, devoted to the education of handicapped children. He subsequently donated the remaining  of land, along with $900,000 in securities, to the University of Minnesota for a hospital and convalescent home. He did not want the hospital to bear his name, instead preferring it to be called the "Minnesota Hospital and Home for Crippled Children."

Eustis eventually donated his interest in the Flour Exchange Building and Corn Exchange Building to the university, along with the rental income. Hospital construction began on November 10, 1928, but by that time he was too ill to attend. Eustis died of heart disease on November 30, 1928. The hospital included an outpatient department, two floors of rooms for inpatient treatment, space for an on-site school, and an amphitheater for teaching purposes. The university eventually named the hospital after Eustis to recognize his generosity.

When the Mayo Memorial Building on campus was completed in 1954, the Eustis Hospital, along with Elliot Hospital, were incorporated into the structure.

Electoral history
Minneapolis Mayoral Election, 1892
William H. Eustis 17,910	
James C. Haynes 15,728		
Charles M. Way 1,842		
Theodore F. Stark 1,665

References

  	

Mayors of Minneapolis
Wesleyan University alumni
Columbia Law School alumni
1845 births
1928 deaths
Minnesota Republicans